Budhabare may refer to:

Budhabare, Koshi, a village development committee in Dhankuta District, Koshi Zone, Nepal
Budhabare, Mechi, a village development committee in Jhapa district, Mechi Zone, Nepal